Cryptoblepharus fuhni, also known commonly as the black-boulder shinning-skink, is a species of lizard in the family Scincidae. The species is endemic to Queensland in Australia.

Etymology
The specific name, fuhni, is in honor of Romanian herpetologist Ion Eduard Fuhn.

Description

Habitat
The preferred natural habitat of C. fuhni is black granite boulders.

Reproduction
C. fuhni is oviparous.

References

Further reading
Cogger HG (2014). Reptiles and Amphibians of Australia, Seventh Edition. Clayton, Victoria, Australia: CSIRO Publishing. xxx + 1,033 pp. .
Covacevich J, Ingram GJ (1978). "An undescribed species of rock dwelling Cryptoblepharus (Lacertilia: Scincidae)". Memoirs of the Queensland Museum 18: 151–154. (Cryptoblepharus fuhni, new species).
Wilson, Steve; Swan, Gerry (2013). A Complete Guide to Reptiles of Australia, Fourth Edition. Sydney: New Holland Publishers. 522 pp. .

Cryptoblepharus
Skinks of Australia
Endemic fauna of Australia
Reptiles described in 1978
Taxa named by Jeanette Covacevich
Taxa named by Glen Joseph Ingram